Royal Air Force Buchan or more simply RAF Buchan is a former Royal Air Force station near Peterhead in Aberdeenshire, Scotland.

Buchan opened in 1952 as a radar centre in the ROTOR radar network. It was soon upgraded with the installation of the powerful AMES Type 80 radar, and became a Master Radar Station, directing most air defence activities directly from its radar displays. During the upgrades to the Linesman/Mediator network it was planned to close, but its location and support for air traffic control kept it operational with its Type 80 through this era.

In 1991, Buchan became one of two locations to host a Control and Reporting Centre (CRC) of the new Improved United Kingdom Air Defence Ground Environment that replaced Linesman. As part of this upgrade, it received an AMES Type 92 radar although its Type 80 continued operations for some time before finally shutting down in 1993 along with its associated Sperry TPS-34 height finders. The CRC was hosted in a double-storey underground bunker (R3A).

As part of another modernization, the United Kingdom Air Surveillance and Control System (UKASCS) moved all control to RAF Boulmer and RAF Scampton, downgrading former radar sites to unattended operation. For this role it retains its Type 92 in a pressurised radome. Because it is now operated remotely, it is referred to as RRH Buchan, for "Remote Radar Head".

History

In 1979 operations moved into interim facilities above ground whilst the 'R3' underground operations block was refitted as an 'R3A', this involved the excavation of one side of the 'R3' and an auxiliary bunker was constructed alongside to provide secure facilities for stand by generators, power cleaning and air filtration. The Buchan Interim Fit (BIF) building housed the GL-161 computer system associated with the TPS-34 radar, both acquired from No 1ACC.

Soviet aircraft transiting between Murmansk in northern Russia and Cuba were routinely intercepted and escorted by live armed fighter aircraft whenever they entered the United Kingdom "area of interest".

Control and Reporting Centre 
Following the collapse of the Warsaw Pact in 1991, Buchan became a Control and Reporting Centre (CRC), part of the UK Air Surveillance and Control System (UKASACS). Buchan was responsible for UK airspace north of Newcastle, working closely with counterparts in Scandinavian countries. The southern CRC was located at RAF Neatishead in Norfolk. Around the same time, Buchan became parent station for RAF Saxa Vord in Shetland (91 Signals Unit) and RAF Benbecula (71 Signals Unit) in the Outer Hebrides, both of which were downgraded to reporting posts which feed data into the UKASACS.

Together, the two CRCs processed information which was provided continuously by reporting posts and civilian radars, producing an overview of all aircraft operating within UK airspace, known as the Recognised Air Picture (RAP). Information would also be communicated via digital data-links to neighbouring NATO countries, Airborne Early Warning (AEW) & other aircraft, ground units and ships. Fighter controllers at Buchan also provided tactical control of air-defence aircraft during peacetime Quick Reaction Alert (QRA) interceptions, during training and in the event of war.

In 1994 Buchan was home to Nos 170 and 487 Signals Unit and the CRC.

As part of a major upgrade of RRH sites around the UK the MOD began a programme titled HYDRA IN 2020 to install new state of the art communications buildings, radar towers and bespoke perimeter security.

Closure and downgrading 
Throughout the remainder of the station's lifetime, its role was gradually sidelined in favour of the Control Reporting Centre at RAF Neatishead. In May 2000 the Ministry of Defence announced the downgrading of RAF Buchan from a manned station to a remote radar head and that RAF Boulmer in Northumberland and RAF Neatishead in Norfolk, would continue to operate the surveillance and control system. The measure resulted in the loss of 55 civilian jobs and the transfer of over 200 RAF personnel from Buchan. Around 92 military and civilian personnel were expected to remain to operate the remote radar head.

Buchan ceased to be a RAF station on 1 September 2004 and the operational part of the station was downgraded and renamed Remote Radar Head Buchan. Manned operations formally ceased at RAF Buchan on 26 November 2004 and the domestic site was officially downsized on 31 March 2005.

Post-closure 
Buchan continues to operate as a Remote Radar Head, inputting radar data to the UK Air Surveillance and Control System (UKASACS).

The separate domestic accommodation site, located in nearby Boddam, was sold by the Ministry of Defence to a private developer. In 2009 the Officers' Mess was converted into the four star Buchan Braes Hotel.

A large part of the domestic site is now home to an Army Cadet Force unit.

See also
Improved United Kingdom Air Defence Ground Environment – UK air defence radar system in the UK between the 1990s and 2000s
Linesman/Mediator – UK air defence radar system in the UK between the 1960s and 1984
List of former Royal Air Force stations
NATO Integrated Air Defense System

References

External links
Official website
Photos and info of the RAF Buchan Statue
Subterranea Britannica
Gazetteer for RAF Buchan
RAF Buchan on RAF website

Buildings and structures in Buchan
Radar stations
Buchan
Radar equipment of the Cold War